Just Cause Y'all Waited 2 is the fifth studio album by American rapper Lil Durk. It was released on May 8, 2020, by Only the Family, Alamo Records and Geffen Records, serving as a sequel to his 2018 Just Cause Y'all Waited mixtape. It features guest appearances from Lil Baby, Polo G, Gunna, and G Herbo. A deluxe edition of the album was released on June 26, 2020, with seven additional tracks, propelling the album to a new peak of number two on the Billboard 200.

Commercial performance
Just Cause Y'all Waited 2 debuted at number five on the US Billboard 200 chart, earning 57,000 album-equivalent units (including 3,000 copies of pure album sales) in its first week. This became Lil Durk's second US top-five debut. The album also accumulated a total of 74.67 million on-demand streams of the album’s songs during the tracking week. After the release of the deluxe version, the album returned to top-ten and achieved at new peak at number two on the chart, earning 43,000 album-equivalent units. On December 17, 2020, the album was certified gold by the Recording Industry Association of America (RIAA) for combined sales and album-equivalent units of over 500,000 units in the United States.

Track listing
Credits adapted from Tidal.

Charts

Weekly charts

Year-end charts

Certifications

References

Sequel albums
Lil Durk albums
2020 albums
Albums produced by Cardo
Albums produced by Cardo (record producer)